The 2010–11 Toluca season was the 64th professional season of Mexico's top-flight football league. The season is split into two tournaments—the Torneo Apertura and the Torneo Clausura—each with identical formats and each contested by the same eighteen teams. Cruz Azul will begin their season on July 25, 2010 against UNAM, Toluca will play thei home games on Sundays at noon, local time.

Torneo Apertura

Squad

Regular season

Goalscorers

Transfers

In

Out

Results

Results summary

Results by round

Torneo Clausura

Squad

Regular season

Goalscorers

Results

Results summary

Results by round

References 

2010–11 Primera División de México season
Mexican football clubs 2010–11 season
Deportivo Toluca F.C. seasons